Marrus is a genus of siphonophores. Species include:

Marrus antarcticus Totton, 1954
Marrus claudanielis Dunn, Pugh & Haddock, 2005
Marrus orthocanna Kramp, 1942
Marrus orthocannoides Totton, 1954

References
Mapstone, G. (2011). Marrus Totton, 1954. In: Schuchert, P. World Hydrozoa database. Accessed through the World Register of Marine Species on 2011-09-08

Agalmatidae
Hydrozoan genera